Alamgir village comes under the Bhogpur development block of Jalandhar.  Jalandhar is a district in the Indian state of Punjab.

About 

Alamgir lies on the Jalandhar-Pathankot road.  The nearest railway station to Alamgir is Kala Bakra station at 2 km from it.

References 

Villages in Jalandhar district